George Holden may refer to:

George Holden (Australian rules footballer) (1889–1959), Australian rules footballer for Fitzroy
George Holden (footballer, born 1859) (1859–1920s), English association footballer
George Holden (politician) (1808–1874), Australian politician
George S. Holden (1868–1935), American football player
George Holden (RAF officer) (1913–1943), RAF officer
George Holden (professor), professor and developmental psychologist
Sir George Holden, 2nd Baronet (1890–1937) of the Holden baronets
Sir George Holden, 3rd Baronet (1914–1976) of the Holden baronets

See also
George Holden Tinkham, United States politician